Mladošovice is a municipality and village in České Budějovice District in the South Bohemian Region of the Czech Republic. It has about 400 inhabitants.

Administrative parts
Villages of Lhota and Petrovice are administrative parts of Mladošovice.

References

Villages in České Budějovice District